CHGA may refer to:

CHGA (gene)
 Commission on HIV/AIDS and Governance in Africa
CHGA-FM, French-language community radio station in Quebec, Canada